Canoel is the seat of the hero in of the medieval epic of Tristan and Iseult, versions of which were written by Gottfried von Strassburg, Thomas of England, Béroul, and others. The authors who mention Canoel situate it in "Parmenie", a fictitious land nebulously situated on the French side of the English Channel between Brittany and Normandy. Traditionally, Tristan is from Lyonesse, a lost land very similar to Parmenie.

May also relate to Canoel International Energy; former name of Zenith Energy Ltd., an energy company based in Calgary, Alberta, Canada.

Locations associated with Arthurian legend